Fishers Ferry is an unincorporated community in Northumberland County, in the U.S. state of Pennsylvania. The elevation of Fishers Ferry is 420 feet.

References

Unincorporated communities in Northumberland County, Pennsylvania
Unincorporated communities in Pennsylvania